Capital Collision was a professional wrestling event produced by New Japan Pro-Wrestling (NJPW). It took place on May 14, 2022, at the Entertainment and Sports Arena in Washington, D.C. Wrestlers from NJPW's U.S. partner promotion All Elite Wrestling (AEW) appeared on the card.

Storylines 
Capital Collision featured professional wrestling matches that involved different wrestlers from pre-existing scripted feuds and storylines. Wrestlers portrayed villains, heroes, or less distinguishable characters in the scripted events that built tension and culminated in a wrestling match or series of matches.

Results

References 

2022 in professional wrestling
Events in Washington, D.C.
New Japan Pro-Wrestling shows
Professional wrestling in Washington, D.C.